Lado Lunar (Portuguese for Lunar Side) is the seventh studio by Rui Veloso, released in late 1995.

The album was recorded in Sintra, Portugal, between July and August 1995.

Track listing

References

External links
Lado Lunar at Rate Your Music

1995 albums
Rui Veloso albums